Matt Groenwald (born April 30, 1983 in Park Ridge, Illinois) is an American soccer player who last played right back for the Kansas City Wizards of Major League Soccer.

Groenwald played college soccer at St. John's University from 2001 to 2005, where he finished his career with 15 goals and 22 assists. He also played in the USL Premier Development League for Chicago Fire Premier.

He was drafted in the third round 38th overall, by the Kansas City Wizards in 2006 MLS SuperDraft. He retired due to a medical condition discovered early in the 2007 MLS campaign.

External links
 Matt Groenwald profile at MLSNet

1983 births
Living people
American soccer players
Association football midfielders
Chicago Fire U-23 players
Major League Soccer players
People from Mount Prospect, Illinois
Soccer players from Illinois
Sporting Kansas City draft picks
Sporting Kansas City players
St. John's Red Storm men's soccer players
USL League Two players